St. Mary's Church, Downsmill, also called Woodlands Church, is a medieval church and National Monument in the Glen of the Downs, County Wicklow, Ireland.

Location

St. Mary's Church is located 1.2 km (¾ mile) west of Delgany, in the southern part of the Glen of the Downs.

History

St. Mary's Church is dated to the 11th century AD, but there is scant evidence for this. Other sources place its construction in the 15th century.

The church was restored in 1906 and the baptismal font inside the door set into place.

Church

St. Mary's is a nave and chancel church, with a bell-cote in the west. The doorway has two bevelled granite jambs. The east wall has an arched window, with the south and north having opposing flat arch windows.

References

Churches in County Wicklow
Archaeological sites in County Wicklow
National Monuments in County Wicklow
Former churches in the Republic of Ireland